is a Japanese voice actor and author. He mainly plays young men and is characterized by his "deep bass voice," and he often performs ad-libs and imitations. 

He is best known for his roles as Gintoki Sakata in Gintama, Tadaomi Karasuma in Assassination Classroom, Hideki Motosuwa in Chobits, Rin Tsuchimi in Shuffle!, Gyoumei Himejima in Demon Slayer: Kimetsu no Yaiba, Kyon in The Melancholy of Haruhi Suzumiya, Yuichi Aizawa in Kanon, Kazuyoshi "Switch" Usui in Sket Dance, Hidenori Tabata in Daily Lives of High School Boys, Yuuya Kizami from the Corpse Party series, Gundham Tanaka from the Danganronpa series, Ragna the Bloodedge in Blazblue, Joseph Joestar in the 2012 JoJo's Bizarre Adventure anime and JoJo's Bizarre Adventure: All Star Battle, Yusuke Kitagawa in Persona 5, Chrom in Fire Emblem, Akuru Akutsu in Aho Girl, Yahiro Takigawa in The Testament of Sister New Devil, Kaede Manyuda in Kakegurui, Charlotte Katakuri in One Piece, and Ultraman Ginga and Dark Lugiel in Ultraman Ginga.

Career
Sugita was born in Ranzan, Saitama. When he was in elementary school and watched the TV anime Dragon Quest: The Adventure of Dai, he noticed that the character Hyunckel had a much lower voice than he had imagined from reading the original manga, and thought he was "still cool," but the moment he said his special move, Sugita realized that it was the same voice as Phoenix Ikki from Saint Seiya (Hideyuki Hori). In junior high school, he was a member of the tennis club and served as the head of the club, while in high school, he joined the Shorinji Kempo club (1-dan). When he was a child, he wanted to be a temple priest, and in high school he wanted to be a home economics teacher, a confectioner, or a designer. At the time, when he thought about writing a script for a stage performance at a school event and added sound effects and background music to a recording of his own voice, his older brother heard it and suggested that he try to find a job that made use of him voice and speech, which led him to become a voice actor. While still in high school, he won the Myuras & Animage Award at the Voice Actor Spring School sponsored by the Japan Narration Actor Institute, and entered the Myuras Actors School (now the Vocal and Dance Division of the Japan Narration Actor Institute), while at the same time belonging to the Myuras entertainment agency. At the age of 17, he made his voice acting debut as a gift announcement narrator for Kamen Rider on SKY PerfecTV!.

In 1999, when he was a prep school student, he got his first regular role in an anime production with Cybuster, and continued his voice acting career while studying until he graduated from university. After the dissolution of Myuras in 2001, he joined Atomic Monkey after a period of freelancing, and made his first leading role playing Hideki Motosuwa in the anime series Chobits.

Sugita played the leading roles in both Gintama (Gintoki Sakata) and The Melancholy of Haruhi Suzumiya (Kyon), greatly increasing his fame. In 2009, he won the Best Actor in supporting role award at the 3rd Seiyu Awards. In October 2013, he won the Male Voice Actor Award at the "Newtype x Machi★Asobi Anime Awards 2013", and his role in Gargantia on the Verdurous Planet, Chamber K6821, also won the Mascot Character Award.

In 2010, he starred in a live-action film Wonderful World, alongside Mamoru Miyano, Tomokazu Seki, Rikiya Koyama, Yuka Hirata, Showtaro Morikubo and Daisuke Namikawa.<ref>""{{cite news|url=https://www.animenewsnetwork.com/news/2009-12-08/namikawa-directs-1st-film/live-action-wonderful-world|title=Namikawa Directs 1st Film: Live-Action Wonderful World|date=December 8, 2009|work=Anime News Network|access-date=January 30, 2010}}</ref> On April 1, 2020, Sugita left Atomic Monkey, the company he had been affiliated with for many years, and established AGRS Inc. with Kai Itō, a lawyer well versed in the entertainment industry, as an advisor and himself as the representative director.

Filmography
Anime series

Original video animation

Original net animation

Anime films

Live-action films

Video games

Tokusatsu

Drama CD
 Maid Sama!: Usui Takumi
 Metal Gear Solid: Peace Walker – Heiwa to Kazuhira no Blues: Kazuhira Miller
 Togainu no Chi: Keisuke
 Aitsu no Daihonmei: YamanakaGakuen Alice Doki Doki☆Drama CD'': Akira Tonouchi

Dubbing

Live-action

Animation

Awards

References

External links
  
 
 
 Tomokazu Sugita at GamePlaza-Haruka Voice Acting Database 
 Tomokazu Sugita at Hitoshi Doi's Seiyuu Database
 
 
 
 Tomokazu Sugita at CD Japan

1980 births
Living people
Japanese male video game actors
Japanese male voice actors
Male voice actors from Saitama Prefecture
20th-century Japanese male actors
21st-century Japanese male actors